Harnwell is a surname. Notable people with the surname include:

 Ben Harnwell, founder of Dignitatis Humanae Institute
 Gaylord Harnwell (1903–1982), American educator and physicist
 Jamie Harnwell (born 1977), Australian soccer player

See also
 Barnwell (surname)